George Vincent Gilligan Jr. (born February 10, 1967) is an American writer, producer, and director. He is known for his television work, specifically as creator, head writer, executive producer, and director of AMC's Breaking Bad (2008–2013) and its spin-off prequel series' Better Call Saul (2015–2022). He was a writer and producer for The X-Files (1993–2002; 2016–2018) and was the co-creator of its spin-off, The Lone Gunmen (2001).

Gilligan has won four Primetime Emmy Awards, six Writers Guild of America Awards, two Critics' Choice Television Awards, two Producers Guild of America Awards, a Directors Guild of America Award, and a BAFTA Television Award. Outside of television, he co-wrote the screenplay for the 2008 film Hancock and wrote, produced and directed the Breaking Bad sequel film, El Camino, released on October 11, 2019.

Early life 

Vince Gilligan was born on February 10, 1967, in Richmond, Virginia, the son of Gail, a grade school teacher, and George Vincent Gilligan Sr., an insurance claims adjuster. His parents divorced in 1974. He and his younger brother, Patrick, were raised in Farmville and Chesterfield County, and attended J.P. Wynne Campus School, the laboratory school run by Longwood College, where his mother also taught; Gilligan would later use the name J.P. Wynne for the fictional high school where Walter White teaches in Breaking Bad.

Growing up, Gilligan became best friends with future film editor and film title designer Angus Wall. His interest in film began when Wall's mother, Jackie, who also taught alongside Gilligan's mother at J.P. Wynne, would lend her Super 8 film cameras to him. He used the camera to make science fiction films with Patrick. 

One of his first films was entitled Space Wreck, starring his brother in the lead role. One year later, he won first prize for his age group in a film competition at the University of Virginia.  Jackie would take Wall and Gilligan to Richmond and drop them off at Cloverleaf Mall to see films, and encourage both of them to pursue a career in the arts. "I wouldn't be where I am today if it weren't for Jackie. She was a wonderful lady and a real inspiration," he recalls. 

Gilligan was recognized for his talents and creativity at an early age. George Sr. described him as a "kind of a studious-type young man, and he liked to read, and he had a vivid imagination". He introduced Gilligan to film noir classics, as well as John Wayne and Clint Eastwood Westerns on late-night television. Gilligan won a scholarship to attend the prestigious Interlochen Center for the Arts. After eighth grade, he moved back to Chesterfield to attend Lloyd C. Bird High School.

Education 
After graduating from Lloyd C. Bird High School in 1985, Gilligan went on to attend NYU's Tisch School of the Arts on a scholarship, receiving a Bachelor of Fine Arts degree in film production. While at NYU, he wrote the screenplay for Home Fries; Gilligan received the Virginia Governor's Screenwriting Award in 1989 for the screenplay which was later turned into a film. One of the judges of the competition was Mark Johnson, a film producer. He was impressed by Gilligan, saying he "was the most imaginative writer I'd ever read".

Career

The X-Files and The Lone Gunmen 

Gilligan's big break came when he joined the Fox television drama The X-Files. Gilligan was a fan of the show, and submitted a script to Fox which became the second-season episode "Soft Light". He went on to write 29 more episodes, in addition to being co-executive producer of 44 episodes, executive producer of 40, co-producer of 24, and supervising producer of 20. He also co-created and became executive producer of The X-Files spin-off series The Lone Gunmen. The series only ran for one season of 13 episodes.

Breaking Bad and Better Call Saul 

Gilligan created, wrote, directed, and produced the AMC drama series Breaking Bad. He created the series with the premise that the hero would become the villain. "Television is historically good at keeping its characters in a self-imposed stasis so that shows can go on for years or even decades," he said. "When I realized this, the logical next step was to think, how can I do a show in which the fundamental drive is toward change?" He added that his goal with Walter White was to turn him from "Mr. Chips into Scarface". While pitching the show to studios, Gilligan was initially discouraged when he learned of the existing series Weeds and its similarities to the premise of Breaking Bad. While his producers convinced him that the show was different enough to still be successful, he later stated that he would not have gone forward with the idea had he known about Weeds earlier.

Breaking Bad received widespread critical acclaim and has been praised by many critics as being among the greatest television dramas of all time. Gilligan has been awarded numerous times for writing, directing, and producing the series. The Writers Guild of America has awarded him four times in straight succession, from 2012 to 2014; three as a part of the Breaking Bad writing team and one individually for writing the episode "Box Cutter". He also received two Primetime Emmys in 2013 and 2014 for producing the show. In 2014, he won the Directors Guild of America Award for directing the finale of Breaking Bad, "Felina".

In September 2013, Sony Pictures Television announced a deal with AMC to produce a Breaking Bad spin-off prequel entitled Better Call Saul, to focus on character Saul Goodman from the original series, before he became Walter Whites lawyer, and to star Bob Odenkirk reprising his role as the title character. Gilligan co-created the series with Breaking Bad writer Peter Gould, with both of them acting as showrunners. The first episode, which Gilligan directed and co-wrote, premiered on February 8, 2015. He would leave the Better Call Saul writing staff early in the third season to focus on other projects, resulting in Gould becoming sole showrunner. This transition had been planned since the show's debut. Gilligan remained involved in Better Call Sauls production in a reduced role, directing episodes in the fourth and fifth seasons, before returning to the writers room in the sixth.

In July 2018, it was announced that Gilligan had agreed to stay with Sony TV on a new three-year deal. His deal via his High Bridge Productions company was renewed more recently.

Gilligan quietly developed the script for El Camino: A Breaking Bad Movie, which wraps up the story of Jesse Pinkman following the events of "Felina", Breaking Bad finale, ahead of the show's tenth anniversary. Gilligan subsequently led its direction and filming. The movie was released in a limited theatric screening and on Netflix in October 2019.

Breaking Bad, Better Call Saul, and El Camino, along with various short-form web series associated with these series, have been described informally by the shows' staff and fans as the "Gilliverse".

Following the broadcast run of Better Call Saul, Gilligan said he does not plan to create any more works related to Breaking Bad, but instead was working towards a new show, a science fiction genre piece that has been compared to The X-Files and The Twilight Zone. The yet to be titled show received a two-season order from Apple TV+ in September 2022, with confirmation that Rhea Seehorn, who played Kim Wexler on Better Call Saul, would be in a starring role.

Other work 
Gilligan first had a screenplay produced in 1993 for the romantic comedy film Wilder Napalm. While working on The X-Files, one of Gilligan's early screenplays was produced as a film, Home Fries, which starred Drew Barrymore and Luke Wilson. Gilligan was hired by The X-Files creator Chris Carter to be a consulting producer on his new series Harsh Realm. After The X-Files, Gilligan wrote three episodes of the short lived police procedural series Robbery Homicide Division and an episode of the ABC series Night Stalker. In 2007, Gilligan and fellow The X-Files producer Frank Spotnitz wrote a sci-fi pilot entitled A.M.P.E.D., which was not picked up for a full series. He also rewrote the screenplay for the 2008 Will Smith film Hancock, which was originally written by Vincent Ngo.

Gilligan made his acting debut in 2014 in "VCR Maintenance and Educational Publishing", the ninth episode of the fifth season of NBC's comedy series Community. He plays a cheesy actor hosting "Pile of Bullets", a fictional 1990s VCR-based video game. In September 2013, Sony announced that it struck a deal with CBS to produce a new television series created by Gilligan and David Shore entitled Battle Creek. Based on a script written by Gilligan ten years prior, the show follows the partnership of two police detectives who must compete with a seemingly-perfect FBI agent. Gilligan co-wrote the first episode with Shore, the showrunner of the series. CBS ordered thirteen episodes and the series aired on CBS starting March 1, 2015. CBS decided not to renew the series for a second season.

Personal life 
Gilligan has been with his wife, Holly Rice, since 1991. In an interview in 2011, Gilligan's mother stated that he was raised in the Catholic Church, but he said "I'm pretty much agnostic at this point in my life. But I find atheism just as hard to get my head around as I find fundamental Christianity. Because if there is no such thing as cosmic justice, what is the point of being good?"

He further stated his philosophy as: "I feel some sort of need for biblical atonement, or justice, or something. I like to believe there is some comeuppance, that karma kicks in at some point, even if it takes years or decades to happen. My girlfriend says this great thing that's become my philosophy as well. 'I want to believe there's a heaven. But I can't not believe there's a hell.'"

Filmography

Film

Television

Writer

Acting

Awards and nominations

References

External links 

 
 
 Vince Gilligan at amctv.com
 

1967 births
21st-century American writers
American agnostics
American crime fiction writers
American male screenwriters
American male television writers
Directors Guild of America Award winners
Former Roman Catholics
American writers of Irish descent
Golden Globe Award-winning producers
Living people
People from Chesterfield County, Virginia
People from Farmville, Virginia
Primetime Emmy Award winners
Screenwriters from Virginia
Showrunners
Tisch School of the Arts alumni
Writers from Richmond, Virginia
Western (genre) writers
Writers Guild of America Award winners
Television producers from Virginia